German Horse of the Year is an award for racehorses instituted in 1957. It is the oldest public vote in the German sports. It was instituted by the WDR journalist Addi Furler. The award is decided by public vote.

Records
Most wins:
 3 - Orofino (1981, 1982, 1983)
 3 - Acatenango (1985, 1986, 1987)

Winners since 1990

Winners before 1990

References

Horse racing awards